Grimes (born 1988) is a Canadian musician, singer, songwriter, and record producer.

Grimes may also refer to:

Places

United States
 Grimes, Alabama, a town
 Grimes, California, a census-designated place
 Grimes, Iowa, a city
 Grimes Township, Cerro Gordo County, Iowa
 Grimes, Virginia, an unincorporated community
 Grimes County, Texas
 Grimes Creek, a river in Idaho
 Grimes Field, a public airport near Urbana, Ohio
 Grimes Airport, a private airport in Pennsylvania

Elsewhere
 Grimes Glacier, Antarctica
 Grimes Ridge, Antarctica
 Grime's Graves, a Neolithic flint mining complex in England

People
 Grimes (surname)
 Benjamin Franklin Davis (1832–1863), U.S. Army officer referred to as Grimes

Fictional characters
 Frank Grimes, from The Simpsons episode "Homer's Enemy"
 Rick Grimes, from the comic book series The Walking Dead and television series
 Stella Grimes, a minor character in the Star Trek franchise

Other uses
 Grimes Manufacturing Company – a former American aircraft lighting manufacturer
 USS Grimes (APA-172), a US Navy attack transport ship

See also
 Grime (disambiguation)
 Peter Grimes, an opera by Benjaimin Britten
 Grimes House (disambiguation), various houses on the National Register of Historic Places
 Grimes Octagon Barn, on the National Register of Historic Places